Morad Tahbaz is an Iranian-American businessman and conservationist. He was born in London and holds British citizenship. Tahbaz is a co-founder of the Persian Wildlife Heritage Foundation (PWHF). In January 2018, Iranian authorities arrested Tahbaz along with eight other PWHF-affiliated individuals.

In 2018, an Iranian Presidential Commission composed of Cabinet Ministers appointed by Iranian President Rouhani investigated the allegations and concluded that the facts do not support the claims against Tahbaz or his colleagues.  The Commission declared publicly that Tabhaz and his colleagues did nothing wrong and “must be freed soon.”  

In November 2019, the Iranian judiciary sentenced Tahbaz to 10 years in prison for "contacts with the US enemy government."

In June 2020 and on the occasion of World Environment Day, US Department of State called for the release of Morad Tahbaz. In a video message, Brian Hook encouraged governments to join this call to end the detention of Tahbaz and his colleagues. Tahbaz's family is a part of the Bring Our Families Home campaign which works to bring home wrongful detainees and hostages.

Tahbaz was released from prison 'on furlough' on March 16, 2022. He was returned to prison two days later.

Education
Tahbaz graduated from Colgate University in 1977 with a degree in liberal arts and from Columbia University in 1983 with an MBA.

See also
 List of foreign nationals detained in Iran
 Niloufar Bayani, PWHF employee also being held in detention
 Hostage diplomacy

References

Living people
Year of birth missing (living people)
American people of Iranian descent
21st-century American businesspeople
American conservationists
American people imprisoned in Iran
Iranian prisoners and detainees
Iranian conservationists
Colgate University alumni
Columbia Business School alumni
British people of Iranian descent